Körfuknattleiksfélag ÍA, commonly known as ÍA, is a basketball team based in Akranes, Iceland. It is a subdivision of the sport club Íþróttabandalag Akraness. Its men's team played in the top-tier Úrvalsdeild karla from 1993 to 2000, making the playoffs in 1994, 1997 and 1998. Its women's team played one season in the top-tier Úrvalsdeild kvenna during the 1995-1996 season.

Men's basketball

Recent history
On 22 November 2018, American Chaz Franklin scored a career high 53 points in á 94-123 victory against Leiknir Reykjavík. On 16 April 2019, ÍA lost to Ungmennafélag Álftaness in the 2. deild karla finals, 123-100.

On 4 October 2019, Ingimundur Orri Jóhansson scored 50 points for ÍA in a 151-113 loss against Reynir Sandgerði. In ÍA's next game a week later, he scored 59 points in a 143-124 victory against Stál-úlfur. In the same game, Chaz Franklin also broke the 50-point barrier with his 51 points for ÍA.

In July 2021, Hugo Salgado from Portugal replaced Franklin as head coach. On 10 September, ÍA agreed to take a vacant seat left by Reynir Sandgerði's withdrawal in the second-tier 1. deild karla.

In June 2022, the team hired Nebojsa Knezevic as its head coach.

Honours

Titles
1. deild karla
 Winners (1): 1993

2. deild karla
 Winners (1): 2009

Individual awards

Úrvalsdeild Men's Young Player of the Year
Bjarni Magnússon - 1996
Ægir Hrafn Jónsson - 2000
Úrvalsdeild Men's Coach of the Year
Alexander Ermolinskij - 1997

Úrvalsdeild Men's Domestic All-First Team
Alexander Ermolinskij - 1997
Dagur Þórisson - 1999

Notable players

Notable coaches
 Alexander Ermolinskij
 Ívar Ásgrímsson
 Brynjar Karl Sigurðsson 2001
 Terrence Watson (2011-2012)
 Chaz Franklin (2018-2021)
 Hugo Salgado (2021-2022)
 Nebojsa Knezevic (2022-present)

Women's basketball

History
ÍA women's team played the 1995–1996 season in the top-tier league where it finished last with a 1-17 record. It's lone win came against Valur where Sóley H. Sigurþórsdóttir had 26 points and 10 rebounds in ÍA's 66-58 victory.

Individual awards

Úrvalsdeild Women's Young Player of the Year
Sóley H. Sigurþórsdóttir - 1996

Notable players
 Auður Rafnsdóttir
 Sóley H. Sigurþórsdóttir

Coaches
 Jón Þór Þórðarson 1995–1996

References

External links
KKÍ.is profile

1979 establishments in Iceland
Basketball teams in Iceland